Claudio Lippi (born 3 June 1945) is an Italian television presenter, actor and singer.

Life and career 
Born in Milan, Lippi started his career in 1964 as a singer, obtaining his mayor success with the song "Per ognuno c'è qualcuno". He later attempted without success to launch his own record label, "Disco Azzurro".

Entered in RAI, after hosting several programs for children, Lippi achieved his first success in 1974 with the variety show Tanto Piacere.

He later hosted several successful TV-programs, notably Il pranzo è servito, Mai dire goal, Buona Domenica.

He had a daughter (Lenni) by the actress Laura Belli.

References

External links
 
 Claudio Lippi at Discogs

1945 births
Living people
Singers from Milan
Italian television presenters
Italian male film actors
Italian male singers
Italian pop singers
Male actors from Milan
Mass media people from Milan